The Estonia national rugby league team represents Estonia in the sport of rugby league football.  Estonia started competing in international rugby league in 2005.  They have competed in several tournaments, including the Central Europe Development Tri-Nations and the European Bowl.

Estonia is currently ranked 22nd in the RLIF World Rankings, just behind Latvia and ahead of South Africa.

Results
As part of the RLEF development plan, Estonia has participated in fourth tier competitions with other developing nations.  Estonia have had very limited success in international competition, failing to register a single win.

2006
The year 2006 saw the inaugural entrance of the Estonia into international competition.  They played in the Central Europe Development Tri-Nations against Germany and Austria.  Both of Estonia's games were high scoring, but they lost both matches.

Central Europe Development Tri-Nations
Germany 34–32 Austria – (2006-06-25)
Estonia 24–38 Germany – (2006-07-22)
Austria 56–32 Estonia – (2006-09-02)

2008
In 2008 Estonia them entered the RLEF European Bowl. This tournament was originally scheduled to be contested among Estonia, Latvia and Ukraine.  However, Ukraine was unable to play in the competition, so it became a two game test series, with Latvia taking both matches.

European Bowl
 Estonia 10–48 Latvia  – (2008-06-28)
 Latvia 62–10 Estonia – (2008-08-03)

2009
The 2009 European Bowl was again scheduled to include Estonia, Latvia and Ukraine.  Ukraine was able to compete this time, and dominated the competition.  The game that assured the Ukrainians the championship was an 86–0 victory over Estonia.

European Bowl
 Latvia 6–40 Ukraine  – (2009-07-24)
 Ukraine 86–0 Estonia – (2009-07-26)
 Estonia 4–74 Latvia – (2009-08-08)

See also

Rugby league in Estonia
Estonia Rugby League Federation

References

External links

National rugby league teams
Rugby
Rugby league in Estonia